Palanzone is a mountain of Lombardy, Italy. It has an elevation of 1,436 metres.

Mountains of Lombardy
Mountains of the Alps